Jaws 2 is a 1978 American thriller film directed by Jeannot Szwarc and co-written by Carl Gottlieb. It is the sequel to Steven Spielberg's Jaws (1975), and the second installment in the Jaws franchise. The film stars Roy Scheider as Police Chief Martin Brody, with Lorraine Gary and Murray Hamilton reprising their respective roles as Martin's wife Ellen Brody and mayor Larry Vaughn. It also stars Joseph Mascolo, Jeffrey Kramer, Collin Wilcox, Ann Dusenberry, Mark Gruner, Susan French, Barry Coe, Donna Wilkes, Gary Springer, and Keith Gordon in his first feature film role. The plot concerns Chief Brody suspecting another great white shark is terrorizing the fictional seaside resort of Amity Island, following a series of incidents and disappearances, and his suspicions are eventually proven true.

Like the production of the original film, the production of Jaws 2 was troubled. The first director for the film, John D. Hancock, proved to be unsuitable for an action film and was replaced by Szwarc. Scheider, who only reprised his role to end a contractual issue with Universal, was also unhappy during production and had several heated exchanges with Szwarc.

Jaws 2 was briefly the highest-grossing sequel in history until Rocky II was released in 1979. The film's tagline, "Just when you thought it was safe to go back in the water..." has become one of the most famous in film history and has been parodied and homaged several times. The film received mixed reviews and was followed by Jaws 3-D in 1983 and Jaws: The Revenge in 1987.

Plot

While a new hotel opens on Amity Island, a  great white shark kills two scuba divers photographing the wreckage of the Orca before heading into Amity waters. Their camera, which took pictures during the attack, is recovered the next day. The shark then kills a female water skier. The driver of the boat attempts self-defense by using a gas tank and flare gun, but the boat explodes, killing her and severely burning the right side of the shark's face.

A killer whale carcass is found on the beach. Police Chief Martin Brody believes that a shark is responsible. Brody explains his concerns to Mayor Larry Vaughn, who expresses doubts that the town has another shark problem. Brody then finds floating debris from the destroyed speedboat and the boat driver's burnt remains. Brody calls Matt Hooper for assistance, but he is in Antarctica on a research expedition. Brody prohibits his 17-year-old son Mike from boating out of concern for his safety and instead lands him a job on the beach as a show of community service.

The following day, Brody watches a beach from an observation tower and causes a panic after mistaking a school of bluefish for a shark, and shooting at it. However, his fears are confirmed when photos from the diver's camera are processed, and one of them shows a close-up of the shark. When he presents it to the Amity Town Council, they refuse to believe it is a shark, and vote Brody out as police chief.

The next morning, Mike disobeys his father's orders by going sailing with his friends, taking his 10-year-old younger brother Sean with him. Marge, another teen, takes Sean with her, and they head out on six separate boats, going past a team of divers led by instructor Tom Andrews. Moments after submerging, Andrews encounters the shark. Panicking, he rushes to the surface, causing an embolism. Soon after, the shark hits the boat of teenage couple Eddie Marchand and Tina Wilcox, who have strayed from the others. Eddie falls into the water and is mauled to death.

Brody and his wife Ellen witness Tom's evacuation by ambulance and hear that the other divers suspect something scared him. Deputy Jeff Hendricks, who has taken over as Brody's replacement, tells them that Mike went sailing with his friends, so Brody and Ellen commandeer the police boat, aided by a reluctant Hendricks, to rescue them. They come across Tina's boat and find her hiding in the bow; she confirms the shark's presence. Brody hails a passing boat to take Hendricks, Ellen, and Tina to shore, where the truth is revealed, while he goes searching for the kids.
 
Meanwhile, the shark attacks the group, striking one of their boats and causing most of them to capsize or crash into each other. Mike is knocked unconscious and falls in the water. The only pair whose boat is still seaworthy retrieve Mike and leave the others to take him ashore and get help; Sean and the others remain adrift upon the wreckage of tangled boats. A Coast Guard marine helicopter that Brody contacted arrives to tow them to shore, but the shark latches onto the chopper's pontoons, capsizing it and drowning the pilot. The shark knocks Sean into the water, and Marge sacrifices herself to save him.

Brody finds Mike, who informs him of the situation before Brody sends him to safety. Brody finds the others at Cable Junction, a small island housing an electrical relay station that supplies power to Amity. The cheering and jumping that greet him attract the shark, which attacks again, causing Brody to maroon the police boat. He tries pulling them in with a winch but instead hooks an underwater power cable. The shark hits the boat wreckage, sending most of the teenagers into the water, and they swim to the edge of Cable Junction; Jackie Peters, Mike's love interest, and Sean remain on the boats. Using an inflatable raft, Brody taps the power cable with an oar to lure the shark toward him. The shark bites the cable and is electrocuted. Brody retrieves Sean and Jackie and they join the others on Cable Junction to await rescue.

Cast

Production

Development and writing
Universal wanted a sequel to Jaws early into the success of the original film. Producers David Brown and Richard D. Zanuck realized that someone else would produce the film if they did not, and preferred to be in charge of the project themselves.

In October 1975, Steven Spielberg told the San Francisco Film Festival that "making a sequel to anything is just a cheap carny trick" and that he did not even respond to the producers when they asked him to direct Jaws 2. He claimed that the planned plot was to involve the sons of Quint and Brody hunting a new shark. Brown said that Spielberg did not want to direct the sequel because he felt that he had done the "definitive shark movie". The director later added that his decision was influenced by the problems the Jaws production faced – "I would have done the sequel if I hadn't had such a horrible time at sea on the first film."

Despite Spielberg's rejection, the studio went ahead with plans to make the sequel, leading to an arduous 18-month pre-production process. Howard Sackler, who had contributed to the first film's script but chose not to be credited, was charged with writing the first draft. He originally proposed a prequel based on the sinking of the USS Indianapolis, the story relayed by Quint in the first film. Although Universal president Sidney Sheinberg thought Sackler's treatment for the film was intriguing, he rejected the idea. On Sackler's recommendation, theatre and film director John D. Hancock was chosen to helm the picture.

Hancock began filming in June 1977. However, after nearly a month of filming, Universal and MCA executives disliked the dark, subtle tone that the film was taking and wanted a more lighthearted and action-oriented story. Additionally, Hancock ran into trouble with Sheinberg, who suggested to Hancock and Tristan that his (Sheinberg's) wife, actress Lorraine Gary (Ellen Brody), "should go out on a boat and help to rescue the kids." When told of the idea, Zanuck replied, "Over my dead body." The next draft of the film's screenplay was turned in with Gary not going out to sea. Hancock says that this, and his later firing of another actress who turned out to be a Universal executive's girlfriend, contributed to his own dismissal from the film.

Hancock began to feel the pressure of directing his first epic adventure film "with only three film credits, and all small-scale dramas". The producers were unhappy with his material, and on a Saturday evening in June 1977, after a meeting with the producers and Universal executives, the director was fired. He and his wife left for Rome and production was shut down for a few weeks. The couple had been involved in the film for eighteen months. Hancock blamed his departure on the mechanical shark, telling a newspaper that it still could not swim or bite after a year and a half: "You get a couple of shots, and [the shark] breaks." Echoing the first film's production, Carl Gottlieb was enlisted to further revise the script, adding humor and reducing some of the violence. Gottlieb wrote on location at Fort Walton Beach, Florida. It cost the producers more money to hire Gottlieb to do the rewrite than it would have if they had hired him in the first place.

At this point, Spielberg considered returning to direct the sequel. Over the Bicentennial weekend in 1976, Spielberg had hammered out a screenplay based on Quint's Indianapolis speech. Because of his contract for Close Encounters of the Third Kind, however, Spielberg would not be able to work on the film for a further year and the producers could not wait for him to be free. Production designer Joe Alves (who would direct Jaws 3-D) and Verna Fields (who had been promoted to vice-president at Universal after her acclaimed editing on the first film) proposed that they co-direct it. The request was declined by the Directors Guild of America, partly because they would not allow a DGA member to be replaced by someone who was not one of its members, and partly because they, in the wake of events on the set of The Outlaw Josey Wales, had instituted a ban on any cast or crew members taking over as director during a film's production. The reins were eventually handed to Jeannot Szwarc, best known for the film Bug and whom Alves knew from working on the TV series Night Gallery. Szwarc recommenced production by filming the complicated water skier scene, giving Gottlieb some time to complete the script. He reinstated the character of Deputy Hendricks, played by Jeffrey Kramer, who had been missing from the earlier script. Many of the teenagers were sacked, with the remaining roles developed.

Three sharks were built for the film. The first was the "platform shark", also referred to as the "luxurious shark". Special mechanical effects supervisor Robert Mattey and Roy Arbogast used the same body mould used for the shark in the first film. The sharks from the original film had rotted behind sheds on the lower lot of Universal Studios in the intervening years, and the only pieces that were salvageable were the chromoly tube frames. Mattey's design was much more complicated and ambitious than the first film. The same (male) body was used, but a brand new head was made by sculptor Chris Mueller which made use of an all-new mouth mechanism, one which incorporated jowls to disguise the pinching of the cheeks that had proven to be a problem with the shark in the original film. The sharks for Jaws 2 were known as Bruce Two (the sharks for the original film had been nicknamed "Bruce", after Steven Spielberg's lawyer), but on set they were referred to as "Fidel" and "Harold", the latter after David Brown's Beverly Hills lawyer.  The other shark props used were a fin and a full shark, both of which could be pulled by boats. "Cable Junction", the island shown in the film's climax, was actually a floating barge covered with fiber-glass rocks. This was created in order to enable the shark platform to be positioned to it as close as possible (a real island would have hindered this due to the upward slope of the seabed making the shark platform visible). Like the first film, footage of real sharks filmed by Australian divers Ron and Valerie Taylor was used for movement shots that could not be convincingly achieved using the mechanical sharks.

Although the first film was commended for leaving the shark to the imagination until two thirds of the way through, Szwarc felt that they should show it as much as possible because the dramatic "first image of it coming out of the water" in the first film could never be repeated. Szwarc believed that the reduction of the first film's Hitchcockian suspense was inevitable because the audience already knew what the shark looked like from the first film. Reviewers have since commented that there was no way that they were ever going to duplicate the original's effectiveness. The filmmakers gave the new shark a more menacing look by scarring it in the early boat explosion.

Like the first film, shooting on water proved challenging. Scheider said that they were "always contending with tides, surf and winds ... jellyfish, sharks, waterspouts and hurricane warnings." After spending hours anchoring the sailboats, the wind would change as they were ready to shoot, blowing the sails in the wrong direction. The saltwater's corrosive effect damaged some equipment, including the metal parts in the sharks.

Susan Ford, daughter of U.S. President Gerald Ford, was hired to shoot publicity photographs. Many of these photos appeared in Ray Loynd's Jaws 2 Log, which documented the film's production, similar to the Jaws Log, a  book written by Carl Gottlieb covering production of the first film.

Location
Martha's Vineyard was again used as the location for the town scenes and Emerald Coast was included on this film. Although some residents guarded their privacy, many islanders welcomed the money that the company was bringing. Shortly after the production arrived in June 1977, local newspaper the Grapevine wrote:

Many residents enjoyed being cast as extras. Some people, however, were less pleased by the film crew's presence and refused to cooperate. Only one drugstore allowed its windows to be boarded up for the moody look that Hancock wanted. "Universal Go Home" T-shirts began appearing on the streets in mid-June 1977.

When Szwarc took over, the majority of the film was shot at Navarre Beach in Florida, because of the warm weather and the water's depth being appropriate for the shark platform. The company was at this location from August 1 until December 22, 1977. The production "was a boost to the local economy because local boaters, extras and stand-ins or doubles were hired. Universal brought in actors, directors, producers and their wives, camera and crew people who needed housing, food and clothing for the movie. Services were needed for laundry, dry-cleaning and recreation." Navarre's Holiday Inn "Holidome" was used as the film's headquarters, with the ground floor converted into production offices, and some of the Gulf-front suites remodeled for David Brown and Roy Scheider. Universal rented 100 of the hotel's 200 rooms, spending $1 million. The Holiday Inn was destroyed in the 2004 Atlantic hurricane season. Boats and parts for their maintenance were purchased from local businesses. One proprietor said that he sold "Universal approximately $400,000 worth of boats and equipment".

On one occasion, the Cable Junction Island set, which was built on a barge, broke loose from its anchorage and had to be rescued. Szwarc was contacted one night and told that his island was drifting towards Cuba. Real hammerhead sharks circled the teen actors during the filming of one shot. Because the characters they were playing were meant to be in distress, the crew (filming from a distance) did not realize that the actors were genuinely calling for help.

The interior shots of the teen hang-out where they play pinball were filmed in the original location of the Hog's Breath Saloon on Okaloosa Island. This restaurant later relocated to Destin, Florida as its original building was susceptible to hurricane damage. The production company had to seek dredge and fill permits from Florida's Department of Environmental Regulation to sink the revised platform that controlled the shark on the sea bottom.

Principal photography ended three days before Christmas 1977, on the Choctawhatchee Bay, near Destin, Florida. The actors had to put ice cubes in their mouths to prevent their breath showing on camera. The final sequence to be filmed was the shark being electrocuted on the cable. In mid-January, the crew reconvened in Hollywood with some of the teenage actors for five weeks of post-production photography.

Jaws 2 cost $30 million to produce, over three times more than the original. David Brown says that they did not budget the film "because Universal would never have given a green light to a $30 million budget in those days." The Marine Division Head for Universal on location, Philip Kingry, says that "It cost approximately $80,000 per day to make that movie." When Kingry asked Brown what his budget was, the producer responded, "We're not wasteful, but we're spending the profit from Jaws, and it will take what it takes."

Casting
Roy Scheider reluctantly returned to reprise his role as Martin Brody. In 1977, he had quit the role of Michael Vronsky in The Deer Hunter two weeks before the start of filming because of "creative differences". Scheider was contracted to Universal at the time for a three-picture deal, but the studio offered to forgive his failure to fulfill his contractual obligation if he agreed to appear in Jaws 2. The actor heavily resisted the film, claiming that there was nothing new to create and that people would be watching the film to see the shark, not him. According to his biographer, Scheider was so desperate to be relieved from the role that he "pleaded insanity and went crazy in The Beverly Hills Hotel". However, he was given an attractive financial package for appearing in Jaws 2; he quadrupled his base salary from the first film, and negotiated points (a percentage of the film's net profits). The Star newspaper reported that Scheider received $500,000 for 12 weeks work, plus $35,000 for each additional week that the schedule ran over.

Despite his reluctance, Scheider pledged to do the best job that he could, wanting to make Brody believable. However, the atmosphere was tense on the set, and he often argued with Szwarc. On one occasion, Scheider complained (in front of extras) that Szwarc was wasting time with technical issues and the extras while ignoring the principal actors. A meeting was called with the two, David Brown and Verna Fields, in which Scheider and Szwarc were encouraged to settle their differences. The discussion became heated and a physical fight broke out, which Brown and Fields broke up. The rift was also articulated in written correspondence. In a letter to Szwarc, Scheider wrote that "working with Jeannot Szwarc is knowing he will never say he is sorry or ever admitting he overlooked something. Well, enough of that shit for me!" He requested an apology from the director for not consulting him. Szwarc's reply focused upon completing the film to the "best possible" standard:

Many extras were recruited from Gulf Breeze High School. The students were paid $3 per hour, well above the minimum wage at the time ($2.30/hr), and reveled in being able to miss classes. Casting director Shari Rhodes, requested members of the Gulf Breeze band perform as the Amity High School Band, seen in an early scene in the film showing the opening of the Holiday Inn Amity Shores "Amity Scholarship Fund Benefit". "The GBHS band consisted of approximately 100 members, and band director John Henley chose 28 student musicians, including the band's section known as Henley's Honkers." Universal scheduled their involvement for mid-afternoons to prevent them missing too much time in school. Universal made a contribution of $3,500 to the school and the band for their part in the film. Several other GBHS students were hired as stand-ins or doubles for the teenage actors to appear in the water scenes and to maintain and sail the boats. Richard Dreyfuss, who played Matt Hooper in Jaws, said he chose not to return in Jaws 2 due to Spielberg not directing it.

Music

Soundtrack

John Williams returned to score Jaws 2 after winning an Academy Award for Best Original Score for his work on the first film. Williams says that it was assumed by everyone that "the music would come back also and be part of the cast ... it would require new music, certainly, but the signature music of Jaws should be used as well". He compares this to "the great tradition" for repeating musical themes in Hollywood serials such as Roy Rogers and The Lone Ranger. In addition to the familiar themes, Szwarc says Williams also composed a "youthful counterpoint to the shark that is always around when the kids are sailing or going out to sea. It was very inventive".

Szwarc said that the sequel's music should be "more complex because it was a more complex film". Williams says that this score is broader, allowing him to make more use of the orchestra, and use longer notes, and "fill the space" created by the director. Williams used a larger ensemble than for the first film, and "the orchestral palette may have been broader or had longer notes". Delays in shooting meant that Williams was forced to start working on the score before the film was completed. Szwarc discussed the film with the composer, showing him edited sequences and storyboards. The director praises Williams in being able to work under such difficult conditions. Critic Mike Beek suggests these time constraints enabled Williams "to create themes based on ideas and suggestions, rather than a locked down print."

Critics have praised Williams' score, comparing it favorably to the original. Williams "uses a few basic elements of the original—the obligatory shark motif, for one—and takes the music off in some new and interesting directions." The score is "more disturbing in places" than the original, and "Williams  some new and hugely memorable out to sea adventure music." Because Jaws 2 "isn't a film that requires subtlety ... Williams pulls out all the stops to make it as exciting and hair raising as possible."

According to the liner notes on the soundtrack album, Williams' "sense of the dramatic, coupled with his exquisite musical taste and knowledge of the orchestra definitely stamp this score as truly one of his best." It is "brilliantly performed by a mini-symphony made up of the finest instrumentalists to be found anywhere."  Mike Beek makes positive comments about the film, saying that "the music certainly elevates it to a level it would otherwise never have achieved."

In 2015, Intrada Records issued a two-disc edition with Williams' complete score in chronological order on the first disc and the original 1978 soundtrack album on the second.

Release

Theatrical
Jaws 2 had sneak previews at 31 theaters across the United States on June 2, 1978, including at Loew's State II in New York City, before opening June 16.

Home media
In 1980, MCA Home Video (then known as MCA Videocassette Inc.) released Jaws 2 on VHS, Betamax and Laserdisc, following its 1980 theatrical re-release. In the 1990s, MCA-Universal Home Video reissued it on VHS and Laserdisc. The film received a DVD release on May 22, 2001. Many reviewers praised it for the quantity of special features, with DVD Authority asserting that it had "more than a lot of titles labeled as 'special edition' discs". It includes a 45-minute documentary produced by Laurent Bouzereau, who is responsible for many of the documentaries about Universal's films. Actor Keith Gordon reminisces in a short feature, and Szwarc explains the phonetic problem with its original French title, Les Dents de la mer 2, as it sounded like it ended with the expletive merde (mer deux). This was combated by using the suffix Part 2.

The disc also contains a variety of deleted scenes. These scenes show the animosity between Brody and his wife's boss, Len Peterson (Joseph Mascolo), Brody explaining to Ellen that he is not about to take any chances letting Mike go sailing, saying that the "smell of death" is the same in Amity as it is in New York, and the selectmen voting to fire Brody; the Mayor (Murray Hamilton) is the only person to vote to save him. These scenes were cut because they were slowing the film's pace. Also included is footage of the shark attacking the coast guard pilot underwater after his helicopter had capsized. The scene was cut because of the struggle with the ratings board to acquire a PG certificate. In the storyboard, it is shown that the helicopter pilot would have escaped and saved Marge (Martha Swatek) from being eaten after she saves Sean, and saves himself as well.

Although the audio was presented in Dolby Digital 2.0 mono, a reviewer for Film Freak Central comments that "Williams' score often sounds deceptively stereophonic". The BBC, though, suggest that the mix "really demands the added bass that a 5.1 effort could have lent it".

Universal Studios released Jaws 2 on Blu-ray in 2016.  The Blu-ray contains most of the bonus materials from the 2001 DVD release, with the exception of the text based bonus features and the galleries.

Reception

Box office

Jaws 2 was the most expensive film that Universal had produced up until that point, costing the studio $30 million.

It opened to a gross of $9,866,023 in 640 theaters across the United States and Canada, ranking first and giving it the highest grossing opening weekend of all time up to that point as well as the single-day record of $3.5 million despite opening on the same day as Grease which grossed $9 million the same weekend, which was greater than any film released prior to that weekend.  It was the first time that there had been two day-and-date releases grossing such high amounts. The opening weekend led it to set a record weekly total of $16,654,000. It went on to earn $77,737,272 during its initial release, making it the #6 highest-grossing film in 1978. It eventually surpassed $100 million with reissues, ultimately earning $102,922,376, and $208,900,376 worldwide. Despite grossing less than half of its predecessor, it became the highest-grossing sequel in history up to that point.

Jaws 2 inspired much more merchandising and sponsors than the first film. Products included sets of trading cards from Topps and Baker's bread, paper cups from Coca-Cola, beach towels, a souvenir program, shark tooth necklaces, coloring and activity books, and a model kit of Brody's truck. A novelization by Hank Searls, based on an earlier draft of the screenplay by Sackler and Tristan, was released, as well as Ray Loynd's The Jaws 2 Log, an account of the film's production. The first chapter of the novelization was published in advance of the film's release in 15 U.S. newspapers, including the Los Angeles Times, the New York Post, Chicago Tribune and The Washington Post, as well as a condensed version of the novelization being published in Reader's Digest. Marvel Comics published a comic book adaptation of the film by writer Rick Marschall and artists Gene Colan and Tom Palmer in Marvel Super Special #6 (also based on the earlier script).

Critical response
Throughout the years, the film has received mixed reviews, though it is widely regarded as the best of the three Jaws sequels. The review aggregator website Rotten Tomatoes reports an approval rating of 61% based on 33 reviews, with an average rating of 5.4/10. The site's critics' consensus reads: "Jaws 2 never approaches the lingering thrills of its classic predecessor, but it's reasonably entertaining for a sequel that has no reason to exist." With a weighted average, Metacritic gave the film a score of 51 out of 100 based on 12 reviews, indicating "mixed or average reviews". Critic John Kenneth Muir comments that opinions towards Jaws 2 depend upon which side of the series it is being compared. Against Spielberg's original, "it is an inferior sequel to a classic", but comparison with the subsequent films Jaws 3-D and Jaws: The Revenge shows Szwarc's film to be "a decent sequel, and one produced before the franchise hit troubled waters." Jaws 2, he says, is "at the deep end of the pool, better than its two shallow follow ups, and there is enough of Jaws lingering greatness floating about to make it an entertaining and exciting two hours." DVD Authority says "After this one, the other Jaws movies seemed to just not be as good." One review says: "it's obviously not a patch on Spielberg's classic, but it's about as good as could be hoped for, with some excellent sequences, almost worthy of the original, several genuine shocks, a different enough story and some pretty decent characters." The performances of Scheider, Gary and Hamilton have been particularly praised.

Among contemporary reviews, Roger Ebert described the film as "pure trash". Gene Siskel gave it two-and-a-half stars out of four in his print review, writing that the film "is worth watching only when its leading player is on camera" and that when the teenage characters were not being attacked, Jaws 2 offers teenage action even less inspired than Beach Blanket Bingo". Vincent Canby of The New York Times wrote, "Some of the action sequences have been well staged, but they've been dropped into the film so indiscriminately that Jaws 2 never builds to a particular climax. It simply drones on and on, like a television movie. Someone also made a mistake in showing us so much of the mechanical shark so early in the film." Charles Champlin of the Los Angeles Times stated, "Maybe because familiarity breeds indifference the more you see of the shark this time the more it seems to have wandered away from the Universal Studios Tour, manmade and mechanical." Tom Pulleine of The Monthly Film Bulletin wrote, "Less a sequel than a remake, Jaws 2 is a tiresomely foregone conclusion to anyone who has seen Spielberg's film ... Even worse, since the events of the first film are acknowledged in this one, the refusal of the mayor and council to act on Brody's warning a second time round makes them appear idiotic to a degree that effectively sabotages any halfway serious dramatic interest."

George Morris for the Texas Monthly preferred Jaws 2 over the original because it is "less insidious in its methods of manipulation" and "because director Jeannot Szwarc streamlines the terror ... By crosscutting among the teenagers, Scheider, and the officials' efforts to rescue them, Szwarc works up enough suspense to keep the adrenaline going." However, Morris' review is not entirely complimentary. He would have preferred the shark to have been seen less, positing "producers and audiences alike seem to have forgotten that the greatest suspense derives from the unseen and the unknown, and that the imagination is capable of conceiving far worse than the materialization of a mere mechanical monster." Similarly, John Simon felt that the "shark's waning is caused by a decline in direction: Jeannot Szwarc has none of Steven Spielberg's manipulative cleverness. For one thing, he allows us close and disarming close-ups of the shark almost immediately ..." A reviewer for the BBC complained that the additional screen time awarded to the shark makes it "seems far less terrifying than its almost mystical contemporary". David Parkinson of Radio Times awarded it two stars out of five, calling it a "pale imitation of the classic original" and stating that "the suspense comes unglued because the film floats in all-too-familiar waters. You just know how everyone is going to react — from the stars to the director, and even the mechanical shark."

Although many critics identify some flaws, often comparing Szwarc negatively to Spielberg, DVD.net states that "this sequel does have some redeeming qualities going for it that make it a good movie in its own right". Richard Dreyfuss and Robert Shaw are missed, especially since the teenage characters are labeled "largely annoying 'Afterschool Special' archetypes" who are "irritating and incessantly screaming" and "don't make for very sympathetic victims". Because of its emphasis upon the teenage cast, some critics have compared the film to the popular slasher films that would soon follow. Also comparing the film's "interchangeable teens to slasher films, particularly the Friday the 13th franchise, Muir says that "it feels wrong for a Jaws film to dwell in that shallow domain." However, the critic also commends the teen characters' comradeship and heroism, citing the girl (Marge) killed when saving Sean from the shark.

The film's tagline, "Just when you thought it was safe to go back in the water ...", has become one of the most famous in film history. Andrew J. Kuehn, who developed the first film's trailer, is credited with coining the phrase. It has been parodied in numerous films, notably the tagline of the 1996 feature film adaptation of the television series, Flipper: "This summer, it's finally safe to go back in the water."

See also
 List of killer shark films

References

Bibliography

External links

 
 
 

1978 films
1978 horror films
1970s English-language films
1970s American films
Sea adventure films
1970s adventure films
Seafaring films
American natural horror films
American sequel films
Films about shark attacks
2
Films about sharks
Films adapted into comics
Films directed by Jeannot Szwarc
Films produced by David Brown
Films produced by Richard D. Zanuck
Films scored by John Williams
Films set in Massachusetts
Films set on fictional islands
Films set on beaches
Films shot in Florida
Films shot in Martha's Vineyard
Universal Pictures films
Films with screenplays by Carl Gottlieb
Films based on works by Peter Benchley
Navarre, Florida
The Zanuck Company films